Scaptesyle tricolor is a moth in the subfamily Arctiinae first described by Francis Walker in 1854. It is found in the Indian state of Assam and possibly Myanmar.

References

Lithosiini